Stewart is an unincorporated community in Rusk County, Texas, United States. According to the Handbook of Texas, the community had a population of 15 in 2000. It is located within the Longview, Texas metropolitan area.

History
A post office was established at Stewart in 1896 and remained in operation until 1907, with William C. Ray as postmaster. Mail delivery was then sent from Elderville. Its population was 15 in 2000.

Geography

Education
The Tatum Independent School District serves area students.

References

Unincorporated communities in Rusk County, Texas
Unincorporated communities in Texas